Kladruby is a municipality and village in Rokycany District in the Plzeň Region of the Czech Republic. It has about 200 inhabitants.

Administrative parts
Villages of Hřešihlavy, Třímany and Vojenice are administrative parts of Kladruby.

References

Villages in Rokycany District